Borna Franić (born 3 May 1975 in Kutina, Croatia) is a former Croatian handball player.

Honours
Moslavina Kutina
Croatian First B League Promotion (1): 1994-95
Croatian Cup Final (1): 1996

Zamet Autotrans
Croatian Cup Final (2): 2000, 2001

Wacker Thun
Swiss Nationalliga A (1): 2012-13
Swiss Cup (2): 2012, 2013
EHF Challenge Cup (1): 2012

Individual
Swiss Nationalliga A top scorer: 2009-10

References

External links
EHF stats

1975 births
Living people
Croatian male handball players
Croatian expatriate sportspeople in Spain
Croatian expatriate sportspeople in Switzerland
People from Kutina
RK Zamet players